Zafarobod is a district of Jizzakh Region in Uzbekistan. The capital lies at the town Zafarobod.

The district consists of 4 urban-type settlements (Zafarobod, Yorqin, Pistalikent, Nurafshon) and 6 rural communities.

References 

Districts of Uzbekistan
Jizzakh Region